Atelopus eusebianus, the Malvasa stubfoot toad, is a species of toad in the family Bufonidae endemic to Colombia. Its natural habitats are subtropical or tropical thigh-altitude grassland and rivers. It is threatened by habitat loss.

References

eusebianus
Amphibians of Colombia
Amphibians of the Andes
Amphibians described in 1993
Taxonomy articles created by Polbot